The following is a list of Memphis Tigers men's basketball head coaches. There have been 19 head coaches of the Tigers in their 102-season history.

Memphis' current head coach is Penny Hardaway. He was hired as the Tigers' head coach in March 2018, replacing Tubby Smith, who was fired after the 2017–18 season.

References

Memphis

Memphis Tigers basketball, men's, coaches